Janus was the codename of a version of Windows Media DRM primarily for portable devices, whose marketing name was Windows Media DRM for Portable Devices (or in short form WMDRM-PD). It was introduced by Microsoft in 2004 for use on portable media devices which store and access content offline. Napster To Go was the first online music store to require the Janus technology. Supporting Janus often implies that the device also makes use of Media Transfer Protocol (MTP).

Janus initially required supporting devices to not support non-Microsoft audio formats such as Ogg Vorbis, but this requirement was later removed.

Characteristics
To support Janus, devices must support:

 Secure time
 License storage for content items
 Meters

All of these are supported by way of challenge–response authentication commands.

Stores that required Janus on portable devices

Devices that used Janus
 Most BlackBerry OS devices
 Audiovox SMT 5600 smartphone
 Toshiba Gigabeat S
 Cowon iAudio X5 (as of firmware 2.11b1)
 Cowon iAudio U3
 Creative Zen portable players (except Stone and Stone Plus)
 Dell DJ 20GB (Gen 2)
 Dell DJ 30GB
 Dell Pocket DJ
 iriver Clix
 iriver H10 series (with MTP firmware only)
 iriver H320 (US version only; after upgrading to EU/KR/JP firmware, DRM capabilities are lost)
 iriver H340 (US version only; after upgrading to EU/KR/JP firmware, DRM capabilities are lost)
 iriver PMC-120 (Portable Media Center)
 Samsung YH-925 (not Australian or European version as onboard radio is lost if firmware is upgraded)
 Samsung YH-999 Portable Media Center
 Samsung YP-T7Z
 Samsung YP-U2JXB/W
 Palm OS devices running Pocket Tunes Deluxe software
 Archos 404
 Archos 504
 Archos 604
 Archos 604 Wi-Fi
 Archos AV700
 Archos AV500
 Archos Gmini402
 Archos Gmini500
 All Windows Mobile devices running Windows Media Player 10
 Nokia N72
 Nokia N91
 TrekStor vibez
 Microsoft Zune (though incompatible with the PlaysForSure stores)
 Sandisk Sansa
 Popcorn Hour C-200
 All Roku DVP devices

References

External links
 
 Nokia N72

Digital rights management systems
Microsoft Windows multimedia technology